Auzatellodes theafundum is a moth in the family Drepanidae. It was described by Jeremy Daniel Holloway in 1998. It is found on Peninsular Malaysia, Borneo and Sumatra. The habitat consists of lowland dipterocarp forests.

References

Moths described in 1998
Drepaninae
Moths of Asia